Windham is an English surname and may refer to:

People

Surname
de Wymondham (Windham), lords of Wymondham, later of Felbrigg Hall
Ailward de Wymondham (fl. 12th century), a person of some consideration in the time of Henry the First
William Windham (of Earsham, senior) (died 1730), Member of Parliament 1722–1730
William Windham (of Earsham, junior) (c. 1706–1789), his son, Member of Parliament 1766–1768
William Windham, Sr. (1717–1761), of Felbrigg, traveler and militia advocate
William Windham (1750–1810), of Felbrigg, Whig statesman
William Lukin Windham (1768–1833), Royal Navy officer
William Windham (Liberal politician) (William Howe Windham, died 1854), son of the above, Member of Parliament 1832–1835
Barry Windham (born 1961), American professional wrestlers 
Charles Ash Windham (1810-1870), British Army officer and Conservative Party politician
Craig Windham (1949–2016), journalist for National Public Radio
David Windham (born 1961), American football player
Donald Windham (1920-2010), American writer
Kathryn Tucker Windham (1918-2011), American writer
Kendall Windham (born 1966), American professional wrestlers
Kevin Windham (born 1978), American motocross racer
Kevin Windham Jr. (Born 1993), American Politician
Ryder Windham, science fiction author
Wendy Windham (born 1967), American actress
William Windham (born 1926), British Olympic rower

Given name
Windham Lawrence Rotunda (born 1987), American professional wrestler

Place names

Canada
Windham Township, Ontario, historic township in Norfolk County, Ontario, Canada

England
Wymondham, Norfolk, occasionally written as Windham

United States
Windham, Connecticut
Windham County, Connecticut
Windham, Iowa
Windham, Maine
Windham, Montana
Windham, New Hampshire
Windham (town), New York
Windham (CDP), New York, within the town of Windham
Windham Mountain, ski resort
Windham, Ohio
Windham Township, Portage County, Ohio
Windham Township, Bradford County, Pennsylvania
Windham Township, Wyoming County, Pennsylvania
Windham, Vermont
Windham County, Vermont

Ships
British East Indiaman Windham (1800), later the Chilean ship Lautaro
USS Windham Bay (CVE-92)
USS Windham County (LST-1170)

School districts
Windham School District (New Hampshire), United States
Windham School District (Texas), United States

Other 
Windham Hill Records, a division of Sony Music Entertainment
Windham Manor, Norfolk, England

See also 
Wyndham (disambiguation)
Wymondham, Norfolk
Wymondham, Leicestershire